Gilkes Wilson and Company was a British locomotive manufacturer at Teesside Engine Works in Middlesbrough which opened in 1843. Initially repairing locomotives, the company built its first engines in 1847.

History
Gilkes and Wilson was formed as a partnership between Quakers Isaac Wilson and Edgar Gilkes.

In 1865 the company merged with Hopkins and Company (establishers of the Tees Side Iron Works, 1857) to become Hopkins Gilkes and Company.

The firm undertook design, construction and manufacture of the ironwork for the Deepdale viaduct (b.1857-1860) on the Stainmore Railway Company to a design of Thomas Bouch and Robert Henry Bow.

In 1875, the name changed again to the Tees-side Iron and Engine Works Company Limited, having built 351 locomotives in total.

Subsequently the firm worked with Bouch on the Tay Bridge, and had their reputation very badly damaged as a result of the Tay Bridge Disaster. The 1870s Long Depression forced several Cleveland iron firms out of business including Hopkin Gilkes.

The company closed in 1880.

Customers
Edgar Gilkes had worked for the Stockton and Darlington Railway and large numbers were built for the line and the North Eastern Railway. Other customers were:
 York, Newcastle and Berwick Railway
 Leeds and Thirsk Railway
 Newmarket and Great Chesterford Railway
 Llanelly Railway
 Liskeard and Caradon Railway.

References

Sources

Further reading

External links
 Tay Bridge, Dundee

Locomotive manufacturers of the United Kingdom
Companies based in Middlesbrough
Vehicle manufacturing companies established in 1843
Defunct companies based in Yorkshire
1843 establishments in England
British companies established in 1843